The Corpus Christi R.C. Church Complex is a series of several buildings located on Buffalo's historic East Side within the Roman Catholic Diocese of Buffalo. The complex contains the Kolbe Center, Sears Street Hall, Rectory, Convent and the huge sandstone church that towers over the neighborhood. The complex school was closed in 1982 and has been razed.

History
Corpus Christi was the seventh Polish parish established in Buffalo. The Church was founded by Fr. Hyacinth Fudzinski, a Franciscan friar from Czarnków, Poland. The church was established to serve the religious needs of the growing Polish community of the East Side. The church community grew in the early 20th century as immigrants poured into the neighborhood.  The church has suffered the problems that have plagued other inner-city churches across America the past 30 years. As parishioners moved to the suburbs, the church became increasingly empty during masses and the school was closed in the early 1980s.

Building
Completed in 1907, Corpus Christi's imposing facade is wrought of Hummelstown brownstone quarried in Dauphin County, Pennsylvania. The church has 3 large bells, all in the north tower. The largest bell dates to 1898, the smaller bells were installed in 1948. All were cast by the Meneely Bell Foundry in Troy, NY. The crosses atop the towers were filled with letters from the parish's school children before they were affixed to the cupolas. The original church windows were made by Franz Mayer works in Munich, Germany.

Present day
In June 2003, the Franciscan Friars decided that they could no longer administer to the community due to financial and other concerns. This announcement led to the creation of a committee named "The Friends of Corpus Christi", who sought to find another order to lead the faithful. This search yielded results when the Pauline Fathers agreed to take over the Church property and continue the rich heritage. The Paulines currently have two priests and one brother administering to the parish community. The current Pastor is Fr. Anselm Chalupka.

The Complex was listed on the National Register of Historic Places in 2007.

Gallery

References

External links

 The Online Voice of Buffalo's Historic Polonia
 City of Buffalo Preservation Board Survey CBCA PN 03-010 (see page 5-12 & 5-13)
 Buffalo As History Church Info
 Corpus Christi Church's Official Website

Churches on the National Register of Historic Places in New York (state)
Roman Catholic churches in Buffalo, New York
Polish-American culture in Buffalo, New York
Onondaga limestone
National Register of Historic Places in Buffalo, New York